A tank container or tanktainer is an intermodal container for the transport of liquids, gases and powders as bulk cargo. It is built to the ISO standards, making it suitable for different modes of transportation; as such, it is also called an ISO tank. Both hazardous and non-hazardous products can be transported in tank containers.

A tank container is a vessel of stainless steel surrounded by an insulation and protective layer of usually polyurethane and aluminum. The vessel is in the middle of a steel frame. There are both smaller and larger tank containers, which usually have a size different from the ISO standard sizes.
The trade organization ITCO estimates that as of January 1, 2018 the global fleet of tank containers stands at 552,000 units. Most of these tank containers are owned by operators and leasing companies.

ISO tank containers built to transport hazardous cargo have to meet a variety of regulations including but not limited to IMDG, ADR-RID- US DOT and other. There are a variety of UN Portable tank types, the most common of which is T11 as it is permitted to transport a thousand or more hazardous bulk chemicals.

There are hundreds of tank container operators worldwide; they can vary on the service they offer. The bigger operators typically offer a wide range of services, while smaller operators may only offer services in one region or with one type of tank.

History 

The tank container concept was also employed in Europe by Bob Fossey, an engineer who worked for Williams Fairclough in London. They improved on the 1950s framed American elliptical container tanks, oft noted carrying specified USA engine oils for the UK’s MoD aircraft built in Preston, Lancashire. In 1964 Fairclough made a swap body tank for combined transport by truck and train, but not yet constructed according to ISO standards. In 1966, commercial production began and one year later the first tank container to ISO dimensions was developed. The first mass-produced tank containers were purchased by Trafpak, a part of Pakhoed.

In 1969, the ISOTANK was registered as a name by Andrews of Aintree Ltd., Liverpool. Theirs were the first ISO container tanks in the world to get Lloyds Register and the UK DoT Hazardous Goods Department design approvals for international transport. They were essential and additional to UK approvals, much good advice was gained from several relevant, sound authorities in USA; Canada; Australia; R S Africa et al..

Built by Andrews of Aintree., Liverpool, and tested at Ellis Research facility. George Lambert, the ISOTANK’S designer, was also the company’s division head, thus responsible for sales or advising clients on the new product’s wide range of complex issues.

This first order to Andrews came from a major shipping line entering the bulk sensitive liquids by ISO means. It was reported as won by merit of the approved data and reputation. The initial order was for 20 off insulated and electrically heated units, 10 for hazardous substances, 10 for non- hazardous substances.

In the early 1970s. The tank container evolved to its current form and the production was also well underway. In the early days, production took place in Europe. In 2010 and afterward, production is mainly in China and South Africa.

Handling 

A tank container can be loaded and unloaded from the top and the bottom. On a standard tank container there is a manhole and at least one valve on the top, and there is a valve at the bottom. Loading and unloading is done by connecting hoses of the loading and unloading facility to the valves of the tank. The loading or unloading is often done using a pump. Depending on the installation and regulation of certain products, it is determined how the tank container should be loaded or unloaded.

Types 

 Food-grade tank - a standard tank container which can only be loaded with foodgrade products
 Reefer tank - a tank with the ability to cool ("refigerate") the product to be transported
 Gas tank - a tank that is suitable for the transport of gases
 Silo tank - a tank for the transport of grains and powders
 T1 ISO tank container (for wine and light liquids)
 T4 ISO tank container (for non-hazardous edible and non-edible oils)
 T11 ISO tank container (for non-hazardous chemicals)
 T14 ISO tank container (for hazardous chemicals and acids like HCl and zinc chloride)
 T50 ISO tank container (for LPG and ammonia gas)
 T75 ISO tank Container ( for Cryogenic liquids )
 SWAP tank container (for cargo above )
 Rubber-lined ISO tank container (for acid-based chemicals)

Competitive modes 

 Barrel
 Flexitank
 Intermediate bulk container
 Tanker
 Tank chassis
 Tank truck
 Tank wagon

See also 
 Liquid hydrogen tanktainer
 Tank chassis

References

External links 
 "History of the Tank Container", International Tank Container Organization (ITCO)

Market overview 
 ITCO Tank Container Fleet Survey
State of the Global Tank Container Industry 2019

Intermodal containers
Fuel containers
Oil storage